The School District of Osceola County, Florida is a school district serving all of Osceola County, Florida. As of the 2011-12 school year, the district had 71 schools. The district has its headquarters in an unincorporated area.

History
The school opened in January, 1975. There was only one other middle school in Kissimmee at the time. It was called Beaumont Middle School and students began the year at that one in August 1974. Student volunteers helped ready the school for opening the first day back from Christmas break.

In 2021 the district, during the COVID-19 pandemic in Florida, began requiring PreK-8 students to wear masks unless their parents opt them out.

Schools

Elementary schools

Boggy Creek Elementary School
Celebration School (K-8)
Central Avenue Elementary School
Chestnut Elementary School for Science and Engineering
Cypress Elementary School
Deerwood Elementary School
East Lake Elementary School
Flora Ridge Elementary School
Harmony Community School (PreK-8)
Hickory Tree Elementary School
Highlands Elementary School
Kissimmee Elementary School
Koa Elementary School
Lakeview Elementary School
Michigan Avenue Elementary School
Mill Creek Elementary School
Narcoossee Elementary School
Neptune Elementary School
Partin Settlement Elementary School
Pleasant Hill Elementary School
Poinciana Academy of Fine Arts
Reedy Creek Elementary School
St. Cloud Elementary School
Sunrise Elementary School
Thacker Avenue Elementary for International Studies
Ventura Elementary School

Middle schools

Celebration School (K-8)
Denn John Middle School
Discovery Intermediate School
Harmony Community School (PreK-8)
Horizon Middle School
Kissimmee Middle School
Narcoossee Middle School
Neptune Middle School
Osceola County School For The Arts (6-12)
Parkway Middle School
St. Cloud Middle School

Harmony Middle School  K-8

Multilevel schools
Celebration School (K-8)
Harmony Community School (PreK-8)
Osceola County School For The Arts (6-12)
Osceola Virtual School (K-8)
Osceola Virtual Secondary School (6-12)
Westside K-8 School

High schools

Celebration High School (The Storm)
Gateway High School (Panther)
Harmony High School (Longhorn)
Liberty High School (Charger)
Osceola County School For The Arts (6-12)
Osceola High School (Kowboy)
Poinciana High School (Eagle)
Professional and Technical High School (PATHS) (Patriot)
Saint Cloud High School (Bulldog)
Tohopekaliga High School (Tiger)
NeoCity Academy (Knight)

Charter schools

Acclaim Academy Charter School (7-12)
Bellalago Charter Academy (K-8)
Canoe Creek Charter Academy School (K-8)
Florida Virtual Academy at Osceola County (K-9)
Four Corners Charter Elementary School (K-5)
Four Corners Upper School (6-11)
iVirtual League Academy (6-11)
Kissimmee Charter Academy School (PreK-8)
Mavericks High School (Ages 15 – 21)
New Dimensions High School
P.M. Wells Charter Academy School (K-8)
Renaissance Charter School at Poinciana (K-8)
UCP Child Development Center (Birth - 5 years)

Alternative programs
Challenger Learning Center
New Beginnings Education Center
Oasis Residential Center
Osceola Regional Juvenile Commitment Facility
Zenith School

Adult education
Adult Learning Center Osceola (ALCO)
Challenger Learning Center
Endeavor
Technical Education Center Osceola (TECO)

Virtual schools
Osceola Virtual School (K-8)
Osceola Virtual Secondary School (6-12)
Florida Virtual Academy at Osceola County (K-9)
iVirtual League Academy (6-11)

References

External links

 The School District of Osceola County, Florida

Education in Osceola County, Florida
Osceola